Capo Spartivento Calabro Lighthouse is an active lighthouse located on the south-easternmost place in Italy in the municipality of Palizzi,  Calabria on the Ionian Sea.

Description
The lighthouse is completely automated and is operated by the Marina Militare with the identification code number 3384 E.F.

See also
 List of lighthouses in Italy
 Palizzi

References

External links

 Servizio Fari Marina Militare 

Lighthouses in Italy
Lighthouses completed in 1867
Buildings and structures in the Province of Reggio Calabria